Jakhan is a village and former Hindu princely state on the Saurashtra peninsula, in Gujarat, western India.

The village is in Limbdi Taluka, in the Limbdi constituency, in Surendranagar District.

History 
The petty princely state, comprising only the single village in Jhalawar prant (Eastern Kathiawar), was ruled by Jhala Rajput Chieftains. In 1901 it had a population of 441, yielding 2,500 Rupees state revenue (1903-4, mostly from land), paying 288 Rupees tribute, to the British and Junagadh State.

References

Sources and external links 
 Imperial Gazetteer, on DSAL.UChicago.edu - Kathiawar

Rajput princely states
Princely states of Gujarat
Villages in Surendranagar district